The Pee Dee is a region in the northeast corner of the U.S. state of South Carolina. It lies along the lower watershed of the Pee Dee River, which was named after the Pee Dee, a Native American tribe that historically inhabited the region.

History
The region was the homeland of the Pee Dee Native Americans, a people who originally occupied the area as part of the South Appalachian Mississippian culture from about 1000 to 1400, leaving some centers for unknown reasons. Today, several nonprofit organizations have been recognized by South Carolina as descendants of the historic Pee Dee, including two state-recognized tribes and one state-recognized group. However, none of these organizations are federally recognized.

Economy

The region's largest city is Florence. It encompasses the Grand Strand, which includes the beaches running from the North Carolina state border to the Winyah Bay in Georgetown County in South Carolina. On the coast, the economy is dominated by tourism, and features beaches, amusement parks, shopping, fishing, and golf. The area has become a major retirement center in the United States, in part because of its low cost of living, mild weather, and its many golf courses. Inland is a belt featuring rivers, marshes, carolina bays, and sandy rises where forestry is predominant. There are pine plantations and baldcypress timbering. Further inland, on higher ground, but still of only slight relief, is an agricultural belt of cultivation of tobacco, cotton, soybeans and produce.

Regional definition 
There is no agreed definition on which of South Carolina's counties are included in the region. The region takes its name from the Pee Dee River. The counties in the Pee Dee region are located, either entirely or partially, within the river's watershed.

Always included 
 Chesterfield County
 Darlington County
 Dillon County
 Florence County
 Marlboro County
 Marion County

Usually included 
 Horry County
 Georgetown County
 Williamsburg County

Rarely included 
 Clarendon County
 Lee County
 Sumter County

Politics 
The Pee Dee region has remained relatively constant during the first decade of the 21st century in terms of its voting history. The region's voters have been close during the previous four presidential elections, but lean toward the Republican Party. The tilt of the region is primarily due to the numerous Republicans resident in Horry County along the Atlantic coast.   

At the congressional level, the region, including the rarely included counties, is located within three congressional districts. The Pee Dee region is mostly contained in South Carolina's 7th congressional district. 

Williamsburg, Clarendon, parts of Sumter, and parts of Florence counties are located in the majority-minority 6th district. Lee and the remaining parts of Sumter counties are located in 5th district. The 5th and 6th districts are represented by Republican Ralph Norman and Democrat Jim Clyburn, respectively. 

The 7th district was established following the 2010 census. In the 2012 elections, incumbents Mulvaney and Clyburn won re-election. Republican Tom Rice defeated Democrat Gloria Tinubu, both of Horry County, 54.9% to 45.1%, to represent South Carolina's new House seat.

Cities

Primary cities 
(population figures is from 2010 census estimates)
 Florence: 37,056
 Myrtle Beach: 27,109

Cities with a population of at least 5,000 
 Bennettsville: 9,425
 Cheraw: 9,069
 Conway: 15,584
 Darlington: 6,720
 Dillon: 6,316
 Georgetown: 8,950
 Hartsville: 7,556
 Lake City: 6,478
 Marion: 7,042
 North Myrtle Beach: 15,516

Higher education

4-year colleges 
 Coastal Carolina University- Conway
 Coker University- Hartsville
 Francis Marion University- Florence

2-year or specialized colleges 
 Florence-Darlington Technical College-Florence
 Horry-Georgetown Technical College- Conway
 Northeastern Technical College- Cheraw
 Williamsburg Technical College- Kingstree
 Webster University- Myrtle Beach

Media 
The area is served by four commercial broadcast television stations, WBTW CBS 13, WPDE ABC 15, WMBF NBC 32 and WFXB Fox 43, the first two with twin studios at Florence and Myrtle Beach, as well as two educational television stations substations, WHMC-TV, in Conway, South Carolina, and WJPM-TV in Florence, South Carolina

Daily newspapers include The Sun News of Myrtle Beach and The Morning News of Florence. The Georgetown Times is published five times per week.

Major highways
Interstate 20
Interstate 95
Future Interstate 73
US Highway 1
US Highway 15
US Highway 17
US Highway 52
US Highway 76
US Highway 301
US Highway 378
US Highway 401
US Highway 501
US Highway 521
US Highway 701 
SC Highway 22
SC Highway 31
SC Highway 9
SC Highway 38
SC Highway 41 & SC Highway 41 ALT
SC Highway 51
SC Highway 145
SC Highway 151
SC Highway 177
SC Highway 261

See also
 Early history of Williamsburg, South Carolina
 Pee Dee Area Council
 Peedee Formation

References

External links
 Pee Dee Tourism Commission

Regions of South Carolina